Christopher Adrian Colabello (born October 24, 1983) is an Italian-American former professional baseball first baseman and outfielder. He played parts of four seasons in Major League Baseball (MLB) for the Minnesota Twins and Toronto Blue Jays, after playing seven seasons in independent baseball.

Early life and career
Born in Framingham, Massachusetts, Colabello grew up in Rimini, Italy. His mother, Silvanna, was born in Rimini, and his father, Lou, played baseball in Italy for seven years, later pitching in the 1984 Olympics. The family moved back to Massachusetts in 1991. Colabello graduated from Milford High School in Milford, Massachusetts. He then attended NCAA Division II Assumption College, but was not drafted by an MLB team.

Professional career

Independent baseball
Prior to joining the Twins organization in 2012, he played seven seasons in the independent Can-Am League for the Worcester Tornadoes (2005–2011) and Nashua Pride (part of 2007).

Minor leagues
In 2012, his first season of affiliated baseball, Colabello batted .284 with 78 runs (4th in the league), 37 doubles (leading the league), 19 home runs (tied for 4th) and 98 runs batted in (RBI) (2nd) for the New Britain Rock Cats of the Double-A Eastern League. He started the 2013 season with the Rochester Red Wings of the Triple-A International League, hitting .358 with 12 home runs in 46 games before being promoted to Minnesota.

Minnesota Twins

2013 season

On May 22, 2013, the Twins promoted Colabello to the major leagues; he made his debut that day. He was called up after Trevor Plouffe suffered a concussion and was placed on the 7-day disabled list. Colabello went 1-for-11 and was optioned on May 29. He was called back up on May 30 after a strained left calf forced Plouffe to the 15-day disabled list. However, after having played two additional games, Colabello was sent down again when Plouffe returned.

Colabello had a very successful minor league season, hitting .352/.427/.639 with 24 home runs (2nd in the league) and 76 RBIs (tied for 2nd) in 89 games, and was named the International League Most Valuable Player at the end of the year, as well as the Rookie of the Year.  Called up to the Twins again towards the end of July, Colabello spent the rest of the year in the big leagues, but his .194 average and 7 home runs in 55 games was far off his minor league pace.

On September 2, 2013, Colabello hit the first major league grand slam off Houston Astros' reliever Chia Jen Lo, and Twins won 10-6.

After his 2013 season, Colabello garnered significant interest from several teams in the Korea Baseball Organization, including a reported $1 million contract offer from the LG Twins (with a similar $1 million buyout going to the Minnesota Twins). On December 21, Colabello announced that he would not pursue the opportunity to play overseas, saying "Going to Korea would mean giving up the dream of being a big-leaguer".

2014 season
In 2014, Colabello made the Twins starting lineup out of the gate, rotating between outfield, first base, and designated hitter.  He had a dazzling start to the season, batting .308 with 3 home runs, and 27 RBIs through his first 23 games.

On April 26, Colabello surpassed Hall of Famer Kirby Puckett's Twins franchise record of 26 RBIs in the month of April. It was a club record that stood for 20 years.

His hot start soon cooled off, as Colabello hit .125 in May and was sent down to the minors by the end of the month. He was recalled by the Twins for July and early August, but did not regain his batting stroke, finishing the season at .229.

Toronto Blue Jays

2015 season

On December 8, 2014, Colabello was claimed off waivers by the Toronto Blue Jays. They designated him for assignment on February 4, 2015, and he was outrighted to the Triple-A Buffalo Bisons on February 11. Colabello batted .337 with 5 home runs and 18 RBI in April 2015, and was named the International League Player of the Month. On May 5, Colabello's contract was purchased by the Blue Jays. In his second game with the Blue Jays, Colabello recorded his first career four-hit game. On May 29, Colabello played his first game against his former team, the Minnesota Twins. In the ninth inning, he hit a tiebreaking two-run home run off closer Glen Perkins to help the Blue Jays win 6–4. Colabello continued his excellent batting on June 7, when he helped the Blue Jays sweep the Houston Astros by hitting a walk-off two-run single. With the hit, he also extended his career-high hitting streak to 17 games. He hit his first career triple on October 2.

Colabello finished the 2015 regular season with career-highs in nearly every statistical category, including batting average (.321), hits (107), home runs (15), RBI (54), and on-base plus slugging (.886). He hit a solo home run in game 5 of the 2015 American League Championship Series, which helped the Blue Jays top the Kansas City Royals on October 21 and force a Game 6.

2016 season
On April 22, 2016, Colabello was suspended 80 games without pay for testing positive on performance-enhancing drugs on March 13. This effectively ended his major league career, as Colabello never played another MLB game after the suspension began.  At the time of his suspension, he was hitting .069 (2-for-29) in 10 games.

In response to the suspension, Colabello released the following statement:
	
On March 13, I got one of the scariest and most definitely the least expected calls of my entire life. I was informed by the Players Association that a banned substance was found in my urine. I have spent every waking moment since that day trying to find an answer as to why or how? The only thing I know is that I would never compromise the integrity of the game of baseball. I love this game too much! I care too deeply about it. I am saddened more for the impact this will have on my teammates, the organization and the fans of the Toronto Blue Jays. I hope that before anyone passes judgement on me they can take a look at the man that I am, and everything that I have done to get to where I am in my career.

On July 13, Colabello was assigned to the Advanced-A Dunedin Blue Jays for a rehab assignment. After rehab, he was assigned to the Triple-A Buffalo Bisons for the remainder of the 2016 season. In 40 games with the Bisons, Colabello hit .180 with five home runs and 11 RBI. On December 2, 2016, Colabello was outrighted to Triple-A Buffalo after clearing waivers. He elected free agency on December 6.

Cleveland Indians
On December 20, 2016, Colabello signed a minor league contract with the Cleveland Indians that included an invitation to spring training.

Colabello did not make the Indians major league roster, and was assigned to Triple-A. He was released on July 8, 2017, after hitting .225 in 72 games for the Triple-A Columbus Clippers.

Milwaukee Brewers
Colabello signed a minor league contract with the Milwaukee Brewers on July 18, 2017. He was assigned to the Triple-A Colorado Springs Sky Sox.  He hit .301 in 44 games for the Sky Sox, but was not placed on the big league roster when teams expanded to 40 players in September. He played briefly for Charros de Jalisco in the Mexican Pacific Winter League in October and early November, before electing free agency on November 6, 2017.

T&A San Marino
In 2018, Colabello signed with the T&A San Marino of the Italian Baseball League, appearing in a total of 9 games during the season.

Sugar Land Skeeters
On May 7, 2019, Colabello signed with the Sugar Land Skeeters of the Atlantic League of Professional Baseball. On June 17, 2019, he was removed from the active roster and placed on the reserve/retired list.

Kansas City T-Bones
On June 23, 2019, Colabello signed with the Kansas City T-Bones of the American Association. He was released on February 4, 2020.

Team Italy
Colabello played for the Italy National Team in the 2013 World Baseball Classic.  He appeared in all 5 games that Italy participated in, going 6-for-18 (.333) with 2 HR and 7 RBI.

On November 22, 2016, it was announced that Colabello would play for Italy at the 2017 World Baseball Classic.

During spring training, Colabello played in the 2017 World Baseball Classic, appearing at first base in all 4 games in which Italy participated. He went 2-for-13 (.154), with 1 HR and 2 RBI.

In September 2018, Colabello played for the Italian national baseball team in the 2018 Super 6 baseball tournament.

He played for Team Italy in the 2019 European Baseball Championship. He played for the team at the Africa/Europe 2020 Olympic Qualification tournament, which took place in Italy in September of 2019.

See also

List of Major League Baseball players suspended for performance-enhancing drugs

References

External links

 

1983 births
Living people
Algodoneros de Guasave players
American expatriate baseball players in Mexico
American people of Italian descent
American sportspeople in doping cases
American expatriate baseball players in Canada
Assumption Greyhounds baseball players
Baseball players from Massachusetts
Buffalo Bisons (minor league) players
Colorado Springs Sky Sox players
Columbus Clippers players
American expatriate baseball players in San Marino
International League MVP award winners
Kansas City T-Bones players
Major League Baseball first basemen
Major League Baseball players suspended for drug offenses
Major League Baseball right fielders
Minnesota Twins players
Nashua Pride players
New Britain Rock Cats players
Sportspeople from Framingham, Massachusetts
Rochester Red Wings players
Sugar Land Skeeters players
T & A San Marino players
Toronto Blue Jays players
Toros del Este players
American expatriate baseball players in the Dominican Republic
Worcester Tornadoes players
2013 World Baseball Classic players
2017 World Baseball Classic players
2019 European Baseball Championship players